Seh Eshgaftan (also Romanized as Seh Eshgaftān; also known as Seh Eshkaftadān and Seh Eshkaftān) is a village in Pian Rural District, in the Central District of Izeh County, Khuzestan Province, Iran. At the 2006 census, its population was 43, in 7 families.

References 

Populated places in Izeh County